The Communal Award was created by the British prime minister Ramsay MacDonald on 16 August 1932. Also known as the MacDonald Award, it was announced after the Round Table Conference (1930–32) and extended the separate electorate to depressed Classes (now known as the Scheduled Caste) and other minorities. The separate electorate was introduced in Indian Councils Act 1909 for Muslims  and extended to Sikhs, Indian Christians, Anglo-Indians and Europeans by Government of India Act 1919.

The separate electorate was now available to the Forward Caste, Muslims, Buddhists, Sikhs, Indian Christians, Anglo-Indians, Europeans and Depressed Classes (now known as the Scheduled Caste) etc. The principle of weightage was also applied. Sir Samuel Hoare asked for clarification of the ninth and last paragraph that applied directly to the Depressed Classes.  The Award favoured the minorities over the Hindus causing consternation and eliciting anger from Gandhi. From the fastness of Yervada Jail he made contact with the Cabinet in London declaring in September 1932 an open fast until death.  

The reason behind introduction of Communal Award was that Ramsay MacDonald considered himself as 'a friend of the Indians' and thus wanted to resolve the issues in India. The Communal Award was announced after the failure of the Second of the Round Table Conferences (India).  The Award attracted severe criticism from Mahatma Gandhi.

The Award was controversial as it was believed by some to have been brought in by the British to create social divide among the Hindus. Gandhi feared that it would disintegrate Hindu society. However, the Communal Award was supported by many among the minority communities, most notably B. R. Ambedkar. According to Ambedkar, Gandhi was ready to award separate electorates to Muslims and Sikhs. But Gandhi was reluctant to give separate electorates to scheduled castes. He was afraid of division inside Congress and Hindu society due to separate scheduled caste representations. But Ambedkar insisted for separate electorate for scheduled caste.

Akali Dal, the representative body of the Sikhs, was also highly critical of the Award since only 19% was reserved to the Sikhs in Punjab, as opposed to the 51% reservation for the Muslims and 30% for the Hindus. Gandhi concurred with the revival of Swaraj which became policy in May 1934 on ratification by the All-India Congress Committee.  The Government reluctantly agreed to lift the ban on Congress.  In return they received anxious support from the Muslim League still smarting from Gandhi's majoritarianism.  After lengthy negotiations, Gandhi reached an agreement with Ambedkar to have a single Hindu electorate, with scheduled castes having seats reserved within it.  The Poona Pact rejected any further advancement for the Depressed, yet satisfied electorates for other religions like Muslims, Buddhists, Sikhs, Indian Christians, Anglo-Indians, Europeans that remained separate.

During the parliamentary debates on the Government of India bill the Untouchables gained a notable champion in a Conservative MP, A.V.Goodman.  He stressed their poverty should be ameliorated by greater representation in the provincial assemblies.  But while Muslim League remained ambivalent to the Communal Award its ratification by the Central Assembly remained a priority.

References

Further reading
 

Indian independence movement
Dalit politics
Dalit history
1932 in India
Reservation in India
B. R. Ambedkar